Upper Air is the second studio album by the folk band Bowerbirds. It was released in 2009.

Track listing

Reception 
Upper Air was well received by critics, scoring 76 out of 100 on Metacritic, which indicates "generally favorable reviews", based on 16 reviews.

References 

2009 albums
Bowerbirds (band) albums
Dead Oceans albums